Slavšina is a settlement in the Municipality of Sveti Andraž v Slovenskih Goricah in northeastern Slovenia. It lies in the Slovene Hills, part of the traditional region of Styria. The area is now included in the Drava Statistical Region.

The village chapel dates to the last quarter of the 19th century.

References

External links
Slavšina at Geopedia

Populated places in the Municipality of Sveti Andraž v Slovenskih Goricah